Luke Kleintank (born May 18, 1990) is an American actor. He is known for playing Finn Abernathy on Bones, Tyler Harne in the 2015 film Max, and Joe Blake in the Amazon series The Man in the High Castle. He is the youngest of six children (Nathan, Sarah, Ruth, Jacob, and Benjamin Kleintank).

Early life
Kleintank was born on May 18, 1990, Kansas City. He and his family moved to Guadalajara, Mexico, when he was two, where he resided for three years, learning to speak English and Spanish. He spent the rest of his formative years in Stevensville, Maryland, where he resided for 12 years. On his father's side, Kleintank is of Dutch and German descent. His second great grandfather Antonius klein Tank (later changed to Kleintank) was born in 1827 in the municipality of Lichtenvoorde, The Netherlands, moved to Cincinnati in 1846 and married Catharina Adelheides Messink from Nordhorn in 1854.

Acting
Kleintank's mother introduced him to acting when he was 5. "She threw me into my first play, Carnival. Made a part for me", he recounts. "That's when I knew I wanted to act." He started doing plays and community theater, and took part in a number of stage productions while in high school.

Kleintank went to New York City to pursue his acting career, and made his television debut as Greg in a 2009 episode of Law & Order: Special Victims Unit. In 2010, he played a recurring role on Gossip Girl as Elliot Leichter, a bisexual love interest for Eric van der Woodsen. After relocating to Los Angeles, Kleintank landed his first daytime role, debuting as Noah Newman in The Young and the Restless on September 21, 2010. He left the role after less than six months to play Chris on No Ordinary Family.

In 2011, Kleintank joined the cast of the Fox series Bones as Finn Abernathy. In 2013, he had a small recurring role in the CBS series Person of Interest as Caleb Phipps, first appearing for one episode in the middle of season 2 and then again as a crucial character for two more episodes in 2015 that was critical to the storyline development towards the season 4 finale. From 2013 to 2014, he portrayed the recurring character of Travis in the ABC Family teen drama series Pretty Little Liars. He played Tyler Harne in the 2015 film Max. From 2015 to 2018, Kleintank played Nazi agent Joe Blake in the Amazon series The Man in the High Castle.

In 2019, Kleintank played Nick Holland in Crown Vic, Platt Barbour in The Goldfinch, and Clarence Dickenson in Midway.

In 2021, Kleintank announced that he will be portraying FBI Special Agent Scott Forrester in CBS crime drama series FBI: International.

Personal life
Kleintank enjoys travelling going on holidays, white water rafting, singing, dancing, writing music, and enjoying family time with his new fiancé and their 6 month old daughter. When not acting, he travels and spends time with his parents, three brothers and two sisters, and his ten nieces and nephews. In December 2018, Kleintank became engaged to Christina Vignaud, daughter of Argentinean  diplomat Juan Carlos Vignaud.

Filmography

Film

Television

References

External links
 

1990 births
21st-century American male actors
American male film actors
American male soap opera actors
American male stage actors
American male television actors
Living people
Male actors from Cincinnati
Male actors from Maryland
Male models from Ohio
People from Stevensville, Maryland
American expatriates in Mexico
American people of Dutch descent
American people of German descent